A knowledge deity is a deity in mythology associated with knowledge, wisdom, or intelligence.

Ancient Egyptian mythology
 Neith, goddess sometimes associated with wisdom
 Thoth, originally a moon deity, later became the god of knowledge and wisdom and the scribe of the gods
 Sia, the deification of wisdom
 Isis, goddess of wisdom, magic and kingship. She was said to be "more clever than a million gods".
 Seshat, goddess of wisdom, knowledge, and writing. Scribe of the gods. Credited with the invention of writing and the alphabet. Later demoted to consort of Thoth.

Armenian mythology
 Anahit, goddess of wisdom
 Tir, the god of written language, schooling, rhetoric, wisdom, and the arts

Aztec mythology
 Quetzalcoatl, god of the winds, art, culture, and wisdom, as well as the patron god of learning and knowledge.

Caribbean mythology
 Papa Legba, loa of speech, communication, understanding, and guardian of crossroads

Celtic mythology
 Ogma, a figure from Irish and Scottish mythology, said to have invented the Ogham alphabet

Chinese mythology 
 Wenchang Wang, the god of literature and scholarship
 Kui Xing, God of examinations
 Zhuyu Xingjun, God of examination successes
 Guan Yu, God of military exams
 Lu Dongbin, God of daoist inner alchemy knowledge
 Laozi, God of wisdom
 Bao Zheng, Star of literature
 Manjushri, the bodhisattva of wisdom

Christian mythology
 The Holy Spirit is the deity of the Christian Triune Godhead who is tasked with guiding humans towards knowledge of righteous action. The Spirit's duties includes pointing non-believers towards knowledge of the Christian faith, and the faithful towards knowledge of right and just action and lifestyle.

Etruscan mythology
 Menrva, goddess of wisdom, war, weaving, and medicine

Greek mythology 
 Apollo, god of artistic knowledge, music, education, and youth
 Athena, Olympian goddess of wisdom, knowledge, civilization, weaving, and war strategy
 Coeus, Titan of the inquisitive mind, his name meaning "query" or "questioning". He is the grandfather of Apollo. 
 Metis, the Titan associated most closely with wisdom and the mother of Athena, whose name in Ancient Greek described a combination of wisdom and cunning.

Hindu mythology

 Saraswati, goddess of knowledge, creativity, and speech
 Ganesha, god of wisdom, luck, and new beginnings
 Murugan, god of war, victory, and knowledge
 Brihaspati, guru of the devas
 Shukra, guru of the asuras
 Chitragupta, god of justice
 Dakshinamurthy, an aspect of Shiva as the guru of sages
 Hayagriva, an aspect of Vishnu and the god of knowledge
 Gayatri, a form of Saraswati and the goddess of hymns
 Savitri, a form of Saraswati and goddess of wisdom

Hittite mythology
 A'as, god of wisdom
 Kamrusepa

Japanese mythology
 Benzaiten, a Japanese form of Saraswati, goddess of everything that flows: water, words, speech, eloquence, music and by extension, knowledge.
 Fukurokuju, god of wisdom and longevity
 Kuebiko, scarecrow god of wisdom and agriculture
 Omoikane, Shinto god of wisdom and intelligence
 Tenjin, god of scholarship

Middle Eastern mythology
 Al-Kutbay, Nabataean god of knowledge and writing
 Enki, Sumerian god of intelligence, crafts, mischief, water, and creation
 Nabu, Babylonian god of wisdom and writing
 Ninimma, a minor Mesopotamian goddess regarded as the scribe and scholar of Enlil
 Nisaba, Sumerian goddess of writing, learning, and the harvest

Muisca mythology
 Bochica, messenger god of knowledge

Neoplatonism
 Nous, the cosmic embodiment of knowledge and intellect.

Lakota mythology
Hnašká, Lakota frog spirit of pezuota (sacred medicine)
Hunúŋpa, Lakota bear spirit of wóksape (Lakota concept of sacred knowledge), lesser spirit of knowledge
Iktómi, Lakota spider spirit of wóksape and trickery, greater knowledge spirit
Kssa, Oglala spirit of knowledge, sometimes considered Iktómi before being stripped of his title
Matȟó, Lakota mischievous healer spirit, taught the Lakota to fish
Ptesáŋwiŋ/White buffalo calf woman, Lakota prophetess, often conflated with Wohpe
Wiyóhiyaŋpa, Lakota wind spirit of the east, oversees new beginnings and knowledge
Whapiya/Wóhpe, Lakota spirit of knowledge, wishes, dreams, visions, prophecy and the wife of Okaga the south wind
Zuzéča, Lakota snake spirit of hidden knowledge and lies

Norse mythology

 Mimir, god of wisdom 
Odin, god of wisdom who nevertheless relentlessly keeps searching for more knowledge; associated with the runes
 Frigg, she is said to know the future, but never tells. The three following goddesses may be hypostases of her.
 Gefjon, goddess associated with plowing, foreknowledge, and virginity.
 Sága, goddess of wisdom
 Snotra, goddess associated with wisdom
 Vör, goddess associated with wisdom

Numerous minor characters in Norse mythology are said to be very wise, though there's often no instance of them demonstrating this supposed wisdom:
Dwarfs, particularly Alviss, whose name means "all-wise". Thor keeps him from marrying his daughter by challenging him to a wisdom contest that lasts all night. He's turned to stone by the rising sun.
Elfs possibly
Heimdallr
Kvasir
Mimir
Tyr
Utgard-Loki, while not outright stated to be wise, he's notable for being the only giant to be cleverer than the gods and getting to escape with his life
Vafthrudnir, a wise jotunn Odin seeks out to challenge to a wisdom contest
the Vanir in general

Persian mythology
 Anahita, goddess of wisdom
 Ahura Mazda, Zoroastrian god of light, benevolence, creation, truth, and perfect wisdom
 Chista, goddess of wisdom and knowledge, she leads the mortals to the right way in life and the afterlife; she is also the goddess of religion in Zoroastrian mythology.

Polynesian mythology
 Anulap, god of magic and knowledge
 Eijebong

Roman mythology
 Egeria, a water nymph who gives wisdom and prophecy in return for libations of water or milk at her sacred grove
 Fabulinus, the God who teaches children to speak
 Minerva, goddess of wisdom and crafts, the Roman equivalent of Athena
 Providentia, goddess of forethought
 Neptune, the god of the sea and freshwater, is said to have all the knowledge of water.

Slavic mythology
 Gamayun, symbol of knowledge and wisdom

Turco-Mongol mythology
 Mergen, deity of abundance and wisdom. Mergen symbolizes intelligence and thought.

Vietnamese mythology
 Nữ thần nghề mộc, the goddess who taught mankind how to create everyday utensils.
 Văn Xương, god of exams, he holds the honor and career of those who follow the academic path.

West African mythology
 Anansi, the spider trickster and spirit of all stories, best known from Akan and Ashanti folklore; according to some tales, also creator of the sun, moon and stars, and teacher of agriculture to humans
 Orunmila, god of wisdom, knowledge, and divination

References

Knowledge deities